Patrick MacDougall may refer to:
 Patrick Leonard MacDougall, British Army officer
 Patrick Campbell MacDougall, Scottish minister of the Free Church of Scotland